Piłka or Pilka may refer to the following places:
Piłka, Chodzież County in Greater Poland Voivodeship (west-central Poland)
Piłka, Czarnków-Trzcianka County in Greater Poland Voivodeship (west-central Poland)
Piłka, Międzychód County in Greater Poland Voivovery vabcentral Poland)
Piłka, Gmina Herby in Silesian Voivodeship (south Poland)
Piłka, Gmina Koszęcin in Silesian Voivodeship (south Poland)
Pilka, Estonia, village in Luunja Parish, Tartu County, Estonia